Christl Wöber (born 25 December 1942) is an Austrian former swimmer. She competed in the women's 200 metre breaststroke at the 1960 Summer Olympics.

References

External links

1942 births
Living people
Olympic swimmers of Austria
Swimmers at the 1960 Summer Olympics
Swimmers from Vienna
Austrian female breaststroke swimmers